Cusp is a 2021 American documentary film directed and produced by Isabel Bethencourt and Parker Hill. It follows three teenage girls at the end of summer.

The film premiered at the 2021 Sundance Film Festival, and was released on Showtime on November 26, 2021.

Synopsis
Three teenage girls in Texas confront the dark corners of adolescence at the end of summer.

Release
The film had its world premiere at the Sundance Film Festival on January 30, 2021. In April 2021, Showtime Documentary Films acquired distribution rights to the film. It was released on Showtime on November 26, 2021.

Reception

Cusp received positive reviews from film critics. It holds a 90% approval rating on review aggregator website Rotten Tomatoes, based on 21 reviews, with a weighted average of 6.90/10. The site's critical consensus reads, "Cusp smartly and sensitively captures the experiences of a trio of teen girls as they navigate the uncertain ground between youth and adulthood."

References

External links
 
 

2021 films
2021 documentary films
Documentary films about adolescence
Documentary films about women in the United States
Films set in Texas
Films shot in Texas
Showtime (TV network) documentary films
2020s American films